The 6th constituency of Hérault is a French legislative constituency in the Hérault département, in the city of Béziers.

Deputies

Election results

2022

 
 
 
 
 
 
 
|-
| colspan="8" bgcolor="#E9E9E9"|
|-

2017

By-election of 2012

The Constitutional Council disallowed the 2012 election, of 10 and 17 June 2012 (Décision n° 2012-4590 AN du 24 octobre 2012). The election of Dolorès Roqué (won by 10 votes) was canceled, and a by-election was held on 9 and 16 December 2012.

2012

2007

 
 
 
 
 
 
 
|-
| colspan="8" bgcolor="#E9E9E9"|
|-

2002

 
 
 
 
 
 
|-
| colspan="8" bgcolor="#E9E9E9"|
|-

1997

 
 
 
 
 
 
|-
| colspan="8" bgcolor="#E9E9E9"|
|-

Sources and References

 
 

6